Eutropis clivicola, known as Inger's mabuya or mountain skink, is a species of skink found in India (Kerala). It was first formally described in 1984 as Mabuya clivicola.

References

 Inger, Robert F.; Shaffer, H. Bradley; Koshy, Mammen; Bakde, Ramesh. 1984. A report on a collection of amphibians and reptiles from the Ponmudi, Kerala, South India. J. Bombay Nat. Hist. Soc. 81 (3): 551-570

Eutropis
Reptiles described in 1984
Reptiles of India
Endemic fauna of India
Taxa named by Robert F. Inger
Taxa named by Bradley H. Shaffer
Taxa named by Mammen Koshy
Taxa named by Ramesh Bakde